Hubert Anton Casimir Dilger (March 5, 1836 – May 4, 1911) was a German-American who became a decorated artillerist in the Union Army during the American Civil War. He was noted as one of the finest artillerists in the Army of the Potomac and received the Medal of Honor for his valiant work at the 1863 Battle of Chancellorsville.

Early life and career
Dilger was born in Engen in the Black Forest region in Germany and educated in the Karlsruhe Military Academy. He served as a lieutenant in the Grand Duke's Horse Artillery at military posts in Gottesau, Karlsruhe, and Rastatt. He developed several innovative theories on artillery tactics and drill.

American Civil War
When news came of the outbreak of the American Civil War, Dilger received a leave of absence and sailed to the United States."

After relocating to Cincinnati, Ohio, he became the captain of Battery I, 1st Ohio Light Artillery and fought at several battles of the Army of the Potomac, including under fellow German native Major General Carl Schurz at the Second Battle of Bull Run.

On May 2, 1863, Dilger fought in the rearguard of the retreating Union XI Corps during the disastrous Battle of Chancellorsville, for which he eventually was awarded the nation's highest decoration in 1893. He unlimbered his battery of six 12-pounder Napoleon smoothbore cannon as a last-ditch defense against a large portion of Stonewall Jackson's entire corps, which had pushed back XI Corps and was threatening to roll up the Union line.

Dilger also received high praise in the Official Records of the Battle of Gettysburg and for his work in the 1864 Atlanta Campaign during which his battery fired the rounds that killed Lt. General Leonidas Polk. Late in the war, he was on garrison duty.

Postwar
From 1869 to 1873, he was Adjutant-General for the State of Illinois.

After the war, Dilger prospered in Ohio and eventually purchased a sprawling horse farm in the Shenandoah Valley near Front Royal, Virginia, where he raised his family. After his death, a portion of his farm was purchased by the US Army as part of the creation of the Front Royal Remount Quartermaster Depot.

Buried in Rock Creek Cemetery, Washington, DC

Notable descendants

Captain Carl Anton Keyser, USNR (18 January 1918 – 7 August 1995), executive officer aboard the USS Eberle (DD-430) during World War II.

Medal of Honor citation
The following citation was issued on August 17, 1893:

Fought his guns until the enemy were upon him, then with one gun hauled in the road by hand he formed the rear guard and kept the enemy at bay by the rapidity of his fire and was the last man in the retreat.

See also
List of Medal of Honor recipients
List of American Civil War Medal of Honor recipients: A–F
German Americans in the Civil War

References

External links
 http://www.familie-dilger.de/indexengl.htm
 

United States Army Medal of Honor recipients
Union Army officers
Adjutants General of Illinois
People of Ohio in the American Civil War
German emigrants to the United States
Military personnel from Cincinnati
People from Front Royal, Virginia
1836 births
1911 deaths
German-born Medal of Honor recipients
Burials at Rock Creek Cemetery
American Civil War recipients of the Medal of Honor
People from Engen